Sutton is a locality in the local government area of the Shire of Buloke, Victoria, Australia.

References